Biatora epirotica is a species of lichen in the family Ramalinaceae. Found in Europe, it was described as new to science in 2011 by lichenologists Christian Printzen and Toby Spribille.

References

epirotica
Lichen species
Lichens described in 2011
Lichens of Europe
Taxa named by Toby Spribille